Opuntia engelmannii is a prickly pear common across the south-central and Southwestern United States and northern Mexico. It goes by a variety of common names, including desert prickly pear, discus prickly pear, Engelmann's prickly pear in the US, and nopal, abrojo, joconostle, and vela de coyote in Mexico.

The nomenclatural history of this species is somewhat complicated due to the varieties, as well as its habit of hybridizing with Opuntia phaeacantha. It differs from Opuntia phaeacantha by being green year round instead of turning reddish purple during winter or dry seasons, as well as having yellow flowers with red centers.

Varieties 
Opuntia engelmannii var. cuija — nopal cuijo; endemic to Mexico, in Guanajuato, Hidalgo, San Luis Potosí.
Opuntia engelmannii var. engelmannii — Engelmann's prickly pear; Mexico, southwestern U.S., California 
Opuntia engelmannii var. flavispina — yellow-spined prickly pear; Arizona, Mexico
Opuntia engelmannii var. laevis — smooth prickly pear; Arizona
Opuntia engelmannii var. lindheimeri — Texas prickly pear; endemic to U.S. in Louisiana, New Mexico, Oklahoma, Texas.<ref>[http://plants.usda.gov/java/profile?symbol=OPENL USDA: var. lindheimeri]</ref>
Opuntia engelmannii var. linguiformis — cow's tongue cactus, cow tongue prickly pear'''; Texas Opuntia engelmannii var. flexospina is most likely a spiny form of Opuntia aciculata.

Distribution
The Opuntia engelmannii range extends from California to Louisiana in the United States, and from Sonora (state)  and Chihuahua (state), to the Tamaulipan matorral in north and central Tamaulipas.

In the Sonoran Desert, terminal pads face predominantly east-west, so as to maximize the absorption of solar radiation during summer rains. Although found occasionally in the Mojave Desert, it tends to be replaced by Opuntia basilaris, which does not need the summer rain.

Naturalised in southern and eastern Africa, including Loisaba in Kenya.

Description
The pads are green (rarely blue-green), obovate to round, about 15–30 cm long and 12–20 cm wide.

The glochids are yellow initially, then brown with age. Spines are extremely variable, with anywhere from 1-8 per areole, and often absent from lower areoles; they are yellow to white, slightly flattened, and 1–6 cm long.

The flowers are yellow, occasionally reddish, 5–8 cm in diameter and about as long. Flowering is in April and May, with each bloom lasting only one day, opening at about 8AM and closing 8 hours later. Pollinators include solitary bees, such as the Antophoridae, and sap beetles.

The purple fleshy fruits are 3–7 cm long.

 Uses 
The fruits were a reliable summer food for Native American tribes. The Tohono O'odham of the Sonoran Desert, in particular,  classified the fruits by color, time of ripening, and how well they kept in storage.Opuntia engelmannii is cultivated as an ornamental plant, for use in drought tolerant gardens, container plantings, and natural landscaping projects.

References

 Edward F. Anderson, The Cactus Family (Timber Press, 2001), pp. 497–498
 Raymond M. Turner, Janice E. Bowers, and Tony L. Burgess, Sonoran Desert Plants: an Ecological Atlas'' (Tucson: The University of Arizona Press, 1995) pp. 291–293

External links

USDA Plants Profile for Opuntia engelmannii var. lindheimeri (Texas pricklypear)
Opuntia engelmannii — U.C. Photo gallery
Herbarium specimen
Opuntia engelmannii photo gallery at Opuntia Web

engelmannii
Cacti of Mexico
Cacti of the United States
North American desert flora
Flora of the California desert regions
Flora of the Chihuahuan Desert
Flora of the Sonoran Deserts
Flora of Northwestern Mexico
Flora of Northeastern Mexico
Flora of Central Mexico
Flora of the Southwestern United States
Flora of Arizona
Flora of California
Flora of Nevada
Flora of New Mexico
Flora of Texas
Flora of Oklahoma
Flora of Louisiana
Flora of Utah
Flora of Chihuahua (state)
Flora of Sonora
Desert fruits
Plants used in Native American cuisine